Giovanni Trigueros Martínez (born 8 December 1966) is a former Salvadoran professional footballer and currently manager.

Club career 
Trigueros has played the majority of his career for Luis Ángel Firpo, with whom he won four league titles in 1989, 1991, 1992 and 1993. He formed a legendary central defensive pairing with Leonel Cárcamo in the national team and was part of the most successful team in the history of Luis Ángel Firpo, lining up alongside players like Marlon Menjívar, Mauricio Cienfuegos and Raúl Díaz Arce.

In March 2005, Trigueros was given a testimonial match, with veteran players of Luis Ángel Firpo and Once Municipal.

Coaching career

El Salvador national under-20 team 
In 2012, Trigueros signed as assistant coach of El Salvador national under-20 football team.

El Salvador women's national team 
In 2014, Trigueros signed as coach of El Salvador women's national football team.

Return to El Salvador national under-20 team 
In 2015, Trigueros signed again as assistant coach of El Salvador national under-20 football team. In February 2015, Trigueros was fired due to budget cuts.

Once Municipal 
In June 2015, Trigueros signed as new coach of Once Municipal, replacing Marco Pineda. In February 2016, Trigueros was replaced by Sandra Escalante de Martínez.

Luis Ángel Firpo 
In March 2018, Trigueros signed as new coach of Luis Ángel Firpo for the Clausura 2018 tournament, replacing Eraldo Correia. However, Trigueros suffered a severe administrative, economic and sports crisis with the club. In May 2018, Trigueros was replaced by assistant coach Jorge Calles.

El Vencedor 
In June 2018, Trigueros signed as new coach of CD El Vencedor.

International career 
Trigueros made his debut for El Salvador in a March 1988 friendly match against Mexico and has earned a total of 47 caps, scoring 1 goal. He has represented his country in 19 FIFA World Cup qualification matches. He has also been captain in the national team.

His final international was a November 1996 friendly match against Mexico.

Honours

Manager

Club
C.D. El Vencedor
 Segunda División
 Champion: Apertura 2018

International goals
Scores and results list El Salvador's goal tally first.

References

1966 births
Living people
People from Ahuachapán
Association football defenders
Salvadoran footballers
El Salvador international footballers
C.D. Luis Ángel Firpo footballers